The Vickers Windsor was a Second World War British four-engine heavy bomber, designed by Barnes Wallis and Rex Pierson at the Vickers-Armstrongs factory at Brooklands.

Design and development
As a possible replacement for the pre-war Vickers Wellington medium bomber, Vickers had proposed a series of designs. The first, to meet the same specification as the Bristol Buckingham and Air Ministry Specification B.11/41, was for a high speed twin-engined medium bomber, with remote controlled turrets in engine nacelles and guns in the nose. This was considered to be neither fast enough to be a fast bomber nor well armed enough to be a normal medium bomber. A four-engined development of the same design was also drawn up. The official position was that the Wellington was becoming obsolete but as the Vickers factories were set up only for geodetic construction any design would need to be based on that method.  Vickers were working on a Wellington with a pressurised cabin for high altitude work and the Ministry was interested in a pressurized version of the Warwick; this was supported by Lord Beaverbrook. The proposed design changed the twin-engined Warwick wing for an elliptical wing with four Merlin engines. The aircraft was expected to manage  having delivered  of bombs. The contract for two prototypes of the Warwick was covered by Specification B.5/41 and development and construction work proceeded until September 1942. In mid-1942, the Wellington replacement and B.5/41 were merged as a result of a new specification, B.3/42 for a Lancaster replacement but without high altitude performance. Vickers could take the work already done along and fit the four-engine wing to a new design of fuselage and a contract was raised for what would become the Windsor. The wings of the first prototypes were built to the earlier specification and so had lower weight limits imposed.  

The Windsor was designed to Air Ministry Specification B.5/41 (later modified to Spec. Notable features of the Windsor included its pressurised crew compartment. The main undercarriage consisted of four single-wheel oleo struts - one in each engine nacelle. The defensive guns were mounted in barbettes at the rear of each outboard nacelle, which were to be remotely operated by a gunner in a pressurised compartment in the extreme tail.

The Windsor used Wallis's geodetic body and wing structure that Vickers had previously used in the Wellesley, Wellington and Warwick bombers. In these aircraft the wing structure flexural strength in bending and the torsional stiffness were calculated (and designed) as being controlled separately by a single spar and the geodetic lattice construction respectively. However, testing of wings showed that the geodetic structure also contributed to the wing bending resistance so, for the Windsor,  Wallis designed the wing so the geodetic structure would take all the torsional and bending loads. This was achieved by gradually reducing the lattice angle (45 degrees relative to the span) at the wing tips to about 15 degrees at the root. A spar was not needed so there was more room for fuel. With no spar the wing was more flexible than before and there was concern that excessive deflections would occur in an emergency landing with wings full of fuel. To limit the deflection at the wing tip Wallis added an extra landing gear leg in the outboard engine nacelles. Instead of doped Irish linen covering used on the earlier geodetic aircraft, a stiff and light skin was used on the Windsor. This was made from woven steel wires and very thin ( thickness) stainless steel ribbons, doped with PVC or other plastic, specially designed to avoid ballooning. To properly fit the skin to the frame, a tuning fork had to be used.

Operational history
Only three examples (the original plus successive prototypes known as Type 457 and Type 461) were built. This was due to refinements in the existing Lancaster bomber, rendering it suitable for the role for which the Windsor had been designed. The first prototype flew on 23 October 1943, the second on 15 February 1944, and the third on 11 July 1944. All three were built at Vickers' secret dispersed Foxwarren Experimental Department between Brooklands and nearby Cobham. The two latter prototypes were tested until the end of the Second World War, when further development and production were cancelled.

Variants
Type 447
First prototype, serialled DW506, powered by four  Rolls-Royce Merlin 65 engines.
Type 457
Second prototype, serialled DW512, powered by four  Merlin 85 engines.
Type 461
Third prototype, serialled NK136, powered by four  Merlin 85 engines, armed with a pair of 20mm guns in each  remote-controlled barbette in rear of outer engine nacelles, aimed from the unarmed tail position.

Operators
 
 Royal Air Force

Specifications (Vickers Windsor Type 447)

See also

References

Notes

Bibliography

 Andrews, C.F. and E.B. Morgan. Vickers Aircraft since 1908. London: Putnam Aeronautical Books, 1988. .
 Bridgman, Leonard, ed. Jane’s All The World’s Aircraft 1945-1946. London: Samson Low, Marston & Company, Ltd., 1946.
 Buttler, Tony. British Secret Projects: Fighters & Bombers 1935-1950. Hinckley: Midland Publishing, 2004. 
 Goulding, James and Philip Moyes. RAF Bomber Command and its Aircraft, 1941-1945. Shepperton, Surrey, UK: Ian Allan Ltd., 1978. .
 Mason, Francis K. The British Bomber since 1914. London: Putnam Aeronautical Books, 1994. .
 Murray, Dr. Iain Bouncing-Bomb Man: The Science of Sir Barnes Wallis. Haynes. .
 Swanborough, Gordon. British Aircraft at War, 1939-1945. Saint Leonards-on-Sea, East Sussex, UK: HPC Publishing, 1997. .

External links 

1940s British bomber aircraft
Windsor
Cancelled military aircraft projects of the United Kingdom
Four-engined tractor aircraft
Mid-wing aircraft
Aircraft first flown in 1943
Four-engined piston aircraft
Barnes Wallis
Strategic bombers